or Expo '70 Commemorative Park is a park in Suita, Japan. It is north of Osaka (about 15 km from Umeda). The park is the former site of Expo '70, a World's Fair held between March 15 and September 13, 1970. It is about 264 ha of lawn and forest, and has education and recreation facilities.

The National Museum of Ethnology, the Osaka Expo '70 Stadium, and part of the Expoland are in this park. The National Museum of Art used to be here but was moved to Nakanoshima area, Kita-ku, Osaka. The park has the Tower of the Sun, a symbolic landmark of the Expo '70, which has been preserved and repaired a number of times. Some of the materials used or built in the Expo '70 remain.

Establishments 

The Natural and Cultural Gardens: there were pavilions in this area. Now it is areas of very large lawn and trees of about 98 ha with over 470,000 trees.
The Japanese Garden: about 26 ha.
National Museum of Ethnology, Japan

Osaka Expo '70 Stadium
Expoland

Train stations 
Banpaku-Kinen-Koen Station, Osaka Monorail Main Line
Koen-higashiguchi Station, Osaka Monorail Saito Line
Yamada Station, Hankyu Senri Line

See also
Japanese post-war economic miracle
Hattori Ryokuchi Park
The 100 Views of Nature in Kansai

References

External links

The Expo Commemoration Park (English)

Urban public parks in Japan
Tourist attractions in Osaka Prefecture
Parks and gardens in Osaka Prefecture
World's fair sites in Osaka
Expo '70
Suita